Dice Head Light is a lighthouse in the town of Castine, Maine. First established in 1829, the light was deactivated in 1937 and replaced by a skeleton tower  to the south. When that structure was destroyed by a storm in 2007, however, the old light was reactivated in 2008.

The lighthouse is listed on the National Register of Historic Places as a contributing property to Castine Historic District.

References

Lighthouses completed in 1829
Lighthouses on the National Register of Historic Places in Maine
Lighthouses in Hancock County, Maine
National Register of Historic Places in Hancock County, Maine
Historic district contributing properties in Maine
1829 establishments in Maine